The 1964–65 French Rugby Union Championship was contested by 56 teams divided into 7 pools.

The four first teams from each pool, along with the best four teams classified fifth in the pools, qualified for the single-elimination portion of the tournament, the "last 32".

Agen won the championship, beating Brive in the final.

Context 
The 1965 Five Nations Championship was won by Wales, which lost (13–22) to France.

The Challenge Yves du Manoir was won by Cognac, which beat Perpignan 5–3.

Qualification round 

Teams in bold qualified for the next round.

Last 32 

Teams in bold advanced to the next round.

Note: Grenoble beat Auch 12–3 but was disqualified, because lined a forme "rugby league" player.

Last 16 

Teams in bold advanced to the next round.

Quarterfinals 

Teams in bold advanced to the next round.

Semifinals 

Teams in bold advanced to the final.

La Voulte was eliminated because they had three players out for injuries in the second half.

During the Brive versus Mont de Marsan match, the referee sent off one player of each team. The player from Brive, Normand, was allowed to play in the final match.

Final

External links 
 Compte rendu finale de 1965 lnr.fr
 Finale 1965 finalesrugby.com

1965
France 1965
Championship